Les Mignons (from mignon, French for "the darlings" or "the dainty ones") was a term used by polemicists in the contentious atmosphere of the French Wars of Religion and taken up by the people of Paris, to designate the favourites of Henry III of France, from his return from Poland to reign in France in 1574, to his assassination in 1589, a disastrous end to which the perception of effeminate weakness contributed. The mignons were frivolous and fashionable young men, to whom public malignity attributed heterodox sexuality, rumors that some historians have found to be a factor in the disintegration of the late Valois monarchy.

History
According to the contemporary chronicler Pierre de l'Estoile, they made themselves "exceedingly odious, as much by their foolish and haughty demeanour, as by their effeminate and immodest dress, but above all by the immense gifts the king made to them." The Joyeuse wedding in 1581 occasioned one of the most extravagant displays of the reign.

The faction of the Malcontents, headed by François, duc d'Alençon, created duc d'Anjou in 1576— the presumed heir as long as Henry remained childless— appear to have stirred up the ill will of the Parisians against them. From 1576 the mignons were attacked by popular opinion, and some historians have credited without proof the scandalous stories of the time. Some fourteen favourites were singled out, including François d'Espinay, seigneur de Saint-Luc, who had accompanied Henry to his "exile" in Poland and was rewarded now with the château de Rozoy-en-Brie and the governorship of Brouage; but the best known of the mignons, the archimignons in L'Estoile's Registre-Journal, who monopolised access to the king after the death of Henri's brother and heir the duc d'Alençon were Anne de Joyeuse, baron d'Arques, created duc de Joyeuse (died 1587) and Jean Louis de Nogaret de La Valette, created duc d'Épernon.

The appearance of the mignons on Henry's visits in July 1576 to the parishes of Paris to raise money to pay for the provisions of the Edict of Beaulieu (1576), occasioned a report by L'Éstoile:
"The name Mignons began, at this time, to travel by word of mouth through the people, to whom they were very odious, as much for their ways which were jesting and haughty as for their paint [make-up] and effeminate and unchaste apparel...Their occupations are gambling, blaspheming... fornicating and following the King everywhere...seeking to please him in everything they do and say, caring little for God or virtue, contenting themselves to be in the good graces of their master, whom they fear and honor more than God."

L'Éstoile added "they wear their hair long, curled and recurled by artifice, with little bonnets of velvet on top of it like whores in the brothels, and the ruffles on their linen shirts are of starched finery and one half foot long so that their heads look like St. John's on a platter."

The figure of Ganymede was employed in scurrilous sonnetry, but the subtext of criticism within the court was most often that the mignons were not drawn from the cream of noble families, as had been the court favourites of his late brother Francis II or their father Henry II, but from the secondary nobility, raised up to such a degree that the social fabric appeared to be unnaturally strained.

The Duel of the Mignons

On April 26 1578, Jacques de Caylus insulted Charles de Balsac, Baron d’Entragues, who responded by challenging de Caylus to a duel. The following morning Jacques de Caylus, with seconds Louis de Maugiron and Jean d'Arcès (of the party of the King), met with de Balzac, bringing seconds François de Ribérac and Georges de Schomberg (of the party of the Henry, Duke of Guise) at the horse market near the Bastille, in Paris. The resultant fight was compared by Brantôme to a reenactment of the battle of the Horatii and the Curiatii. In the melee, seconds Maugiron and Schomberg were killed, Ribérac died of wounds the following noon, and d'Arcès was wounded in the face and convalesced in a hospital for six weeks. de Caylus sustained as many as 19 wounds and conceded the duel to de Balsac, but died of his injuries a month later. Only Balzac got off with a mere scratch on his arm.

This meaningless loss of life impressed itself on the public imagination. Henri III was so angered that he banned dueling in France on penalty of death. Jean Passerat wrote an elegy, Plaintes de Cléophon, on the occasion. In the political treatise Le Theatre de France (1580) the duel was invoked as "the day of the pigs" who "killed each other in the precinct of Saint Paul, serving him in the Muscovite manner". Michel de Montaigne decried the event as une image de lâcheté, "an image of cowardice", and Pierre Brantôme connected it with the deplorable spread of the Italian and Gascon manners at Henry's court. The incident accelerated the estrangement between the two Henrys.

References

Henry III of France
LGBT Roman Catholics
16th century in France
16th century in LGBT history
French LGBT people
History of Catholicism in France
House of Valois
Dueling
Court of Henry III of France
French royal favourites